Örebro County held a county council election on 14 September 2014, on the same day as the general and municipal elections.

Results
The number of seats remained at 71 with the Social Democrats winning the most at 29, a drop of two from in 2010. The party won 40.7% of a vote total of 186,588.

Municipalities

Images

References

Elections in Örebro County
2014 elections in Sweden